Third-seeded Ken Rosewall defeated Mervyn Rose 6–0, 6–3, 6–4 in the final to win the men's singles tennis title at the 1953 Australian Championships.

Seeds
The seeded players are listed below. Ken Rosewall is the champion; others show the round in which they were eliminated.

  Mervyn Rose (finalist)
  Vic Seixas (semifinals)
  Ken Rosewall (champion)
  Fausto Gardini (second round)
  Lew Hoad (second round)
  Ham Richardson (quarterfinals)
  Geoffrey Brown (quarterfinals)
  Straight Clark (quarterfinals)
  Don Candy (second round)
  Rex Hartwig (second round)
  Ian Ayre (semifinals)
  Neale Fraser (second round)

Draw

Key
 Q = Qualifier
 WC = Wild card
 LL = Lucky loser
 r = Retired

Finals

Earlier rounds

Section 1

Section 2

External links
 

1953
1953 in Australian tennis